Ibis is a former rural locality in the Barcaldine Region, Queensland, Australia.

On 22 November 2019 the Queensland Government decided to amalgamate the localities in the Barcaldine Region, resulting in five expanded localities based on the larger towns: Alpha, Aramac, Barcaldine, Jericho and Muttaburra. Ibis was incorporated into Aramac.

Geography 
The Ilfracombe Aramac Road passes through the locality from the south-west (Ilfracombe) to the north-east (Aramac).

Aramac Creek flows from the north-east of the locality (Aramac) to the north-west (Sardine). The creek is a tributary of the Thomson River which is part of the Lake Eyre drainage basin.

The principal land use is grazing.

Education 
There are no schools in Ibis. The nearest primary school is in neighbouring Aramac. The nearest secondary schools are in Aramac (to Year 10 only) and in Barcaldine (to Year 12).

References 

Barcaldine Region
Unbounded localities in Queensland